Glenn L. Jackson (nickname "Mr. Oregon") (April 27, 1902 – June 20, 1980) was a businessman in the U.S. state of Oregon, and an influential transportation planner in the state. He made a strong mark on the state as a 20-year member, and later chair, of the Oregon State Highway Commission, later known as the Oregon Transportation Commission. He was initially appointed to the commission by Governor Mark Hatfield in 1959. He became chair in 1962, and was reappointed by Governors Tom McCall and Robert Straub. Jackson directed the planning and construction of 700 miles of freeway and more than 800 bridges including the Fremont, Astoria–Megler, and Marquam bridges.

Glenn Jackson was born to William L. Jackson, co-publisher of the Albany Democrat-Herald, and Minnie Jackson, a school teacher, in Albany, Oregon on April 27, 1902. He graduated from Oregon State University in 1925 and began working for the California Oregon Power Company (COPCO) in 1928.  Except for a stint in military service during World War II, during which he attained the rank of colonel in the United States Air Force, Jackson continued to work for COPCO or for Mountain States Power Company, eventually becoming manager of COPCO. He became vice-chairman of the board of Pacific Power & Light (PP&L) (now a division of PacifiCorp) in 1961, when COPCO merged with PP&L, and later chairman, until retiring from that position in 1972.

He and his sister inherited a majority share of the Democrat-Herald in 1949. He later bought out the co-publisher and added nine other Oregon weekly newspapers to the company, retaining them until his death in 1980.

Jackson died of cancer at the age of 78 on June 20, 1980, in Portland. The Glenn L. Jackson Memorial Bridge, completed in 1982 to carry Interstate 205 across the Columbia River, is named after him.

Jackson leased, then purchased, in 1946, a fashionable Colonial Revival house in Medford that was designed by noted architect Frank Chamberlain Clark.  The house, known as the Clark-Jackson House, is listed on the National Register of Historic Places.

See also
 Conde McCullough
 Robert Moses

References

External links
 George Edmonston Jr.: Up Close and Personal: “Mr. Oregon”: Glenn L. Jackson, OSU alumni association

Businesspeople from Oregon
1902 births
1980 deaths
History of transportation in Oregon
Oregon Republicans
United States Army officers
American newspaper publishers (people)
People from Albany, Oregon
Oregon State University alumni
Transportation planning
20th-century American businesspeople
Military personnel from Oregon